Matthew Washington Richards (born 1 December 1989) is an English footballer who played as a midfielder in the Football League.

Career
Richards came through the youth team of Derby County but failed to make a first team appearance for the club. He officially signed for Football League Two side Wycombe Wanderers in December 2008 after featuring in reserve games for the club following his release from Derby. on 27 March 2009, he signed for fellow League Two side Notts County on loan until the end of the season. Richards made his professional debut on 2 May 2009, in the Football League Two 2–1 win over his parent club Wycombe Wanderers at Adams Park, coming on as a substitute for Gavin Strachan. He was released from Wycombe in the summer of 2009. He subsequently joined the Glenn Hoddle Academy.

Richards signed for Ilkeston in November 2011 and spent 3 years with them. He briefly joined Heanor Town before taking a year out of the game. Richards returned to action in 2016 when he signed for Belper Town.

Career statistics

References

External links

1989 births
Footballers from Derby
Living people
English footballers
Association football midfielders
Wycombe Wanderers F.C. players
Notts County F.C. players
Ilkeston F.C. players
Heanor Town F.C. players
Belper Town F.C. players
English Football League players